Vainikoniai (formerly ) is a village in Kėdainiai district municipality, in Kaunas County, in central Lithuania. According to the 2011 census, the village had a population of 3 people. There is an abandoned kolkhoz warehouse and a technic yard complex.

Vainikoniai was established during the Interwar in the former land of the Sakūnėliai estate.

Demography

References

Villages in Kaunas County
Kėdainiai District Municipality